Bangladesh–Cyprus relations refer to the bilateral relations between Bangladesh and Cyprus. Neither country has a resident ambassador. Both the countries are members of Non-Aligned Movement, Commonwealth of Nations Relations between the two countries have remained cordial with both the countries showing willingness to strengthen it further.

Cooperation in education 
Bangladesh and Cyprus have been cooperating each other in the education sector. A number of Bangladeshi students get admitted into Cypriot universities to seek entrance in the European job market.

Economic cooperation 
Bangladesh and Cyprus have shown interest to expand the existing bilateral economic activities between the two countries and have been working in this regard. Bangladeshi ready made garments, pharmaceuticals, leather and leather products have been identified as having good potential in the Cypriot market.

Cultural 
Bangladesh sent two captive born female elephants to Paphos zoo. The Asian elephants were reared by Bangladesh Forest Development Corporation.

See also 
 Foreign relations of Bangladesh 
 Foreign relations of Cyprus

References 

 
Cyprus
Bilateral relations of Cyprus
Cyprus
Bangladesh